Betsy's Wedding is a 1990 American romantic comedy film written and directed by Alan Alda. The film stars Alda, Joey Bishop, Madeline Kahn, Catherine O'Hara, Joe Pesci, Ally Sheedy, Bibi Besch, Burt Young, and Molly Ringwald. It was theatrically released in the United States on June 22, 1990, by Buena Vista Pictures Distribution.

Plot
Eddie Hopper is a construction contractor from Long Island, New York, with two grown daughters. One of them, Betsy, is about to be married.

Money is tight in the Hopper household, but Eddie, much to the distress of his wife, Lola, decides that it is important to throw a lavish wedding to impress the well-off family of the man Betsy is to marry. Everyone in the family is throwing advice Eddie's way, even the ghost of his father.

A new house Eddie is building is adding to his financial and emotional woes. In desperation, he turns to his crooked brother-in-law, Oscar, who ends up getting Eddie involved with loan sharks. A young man named Stevie Dee is sent to keep an eye on Eddie, but instead turns his gaze to Connie Hopper, who is not only a police officer but the bride's sister.

Betsy's wedding ultimately goes on as scheduled, but is disrupted by a torrential downpour of rain.

Cast
 Alan Alda as Eddie Hopper
 Madeline Kahn as Lola Hopper
 Molly Ringwald as Betsy Hopper
 Ally Sheedy as Connie Hopper
 Joe Pesci as Oscar Henner
 Anthony LaPaglia as Stevie Dee
 Catherine O'Hara as Gloria Henner
 Burt Young as Georgie
 Joey Bishop as Mr. Hopper
 Dylan Walsh as Jake Lovell
 Bibi Besch as Nancy Lovell
 Julie Bovasso as Grandma
 Larry Block as Barber

Production
The plot was reportedly inspired by the marriage of Alda's youngest daughter.

Reception

Critical response
Betsy's Wedding received mixed reviews from critics. On Rotten Tomatoes it has an approval rating of 55% based on reviews from 11 critics. Reviews of the film included comments such as "threadbare concoction", "narcissism flourishing like ragweed" and "unctuous".

Betsy's Wedding has been cited as launching the film career of Anthony LaPaglia. Joe Pesci was asked about the film in interviews and declined to discuss it.

Accolades

References

External links

 
 
 

1990 films
1990 romantic comedy films
1990s English-language films
American romantic comedy films
Films about families
Films about weddings in the United States
Films directed by Alan Alda
Films produced by Martin Bregman
Films scored by Bruce Broughton
Films shot in New York City
Films shot in North Carolina
Films with screenplays by Alan Alda
Touchstone Pictures films
1990s American films